Tibor Bokros (born 28 August 1989) is a Hungarian football player who currently plays for FC Tiszaújváros.

Career
In August 2018, Bokros joined Cigánd SE. In 2019, he then signed with FC Tiszaújváros.

References

External links
 Profile
 

1989 births
Living people
People from Sátoraljaújhely
Hungarian footballers
Association football defenders
Diósgyőri VTK players
Bőcs KSC footballers
Balmazújvárosi FC players
Cigánd SE players
Nemzeti Bajnokság I players
Nemzeti Bajnokság II players
Sportspeople from Borsod-Abaúj-Zemplén County